Maldi is a village in West Champaran district in the Indian state of Bihar.

Demographics
As of 2011 India census, Maldi had a population of 1926 in 360 households. Males constitute 52.23% of the population and females 47.76%. Maldi has an average literacy rate of 33.28%, lower than the national average of 74%: male literacy is 64.1%, and female literacy is 35.8%. In Maldi, 24% of the population is under 6 years of age.

References

Villages in West Champaran district